Sir Harold Elverston (26 December 1866 – 10 August 1941) was a British Liberal Party politician.

Background
He was born on 26 December 1866, the third son of James Booth Elverston of Heaton Chapel, Stockport. He was educated privately. He married in 1899, Josephine Taylor, daughter of J. J. Taylor of Rusholme, a newspaper proprietor. They had three sons.

Career

He was a member of Manchester City Council. He served on the Executive Committee of the National Liberal Federation from 1906 to 1910. He served as Hon. Secretary of the Lancashire and Cheshire Liberal Federation from 1906 to 1925. 

He served as a Justice of the Peace in Cheshire. He first stood for parliament when he contested the 1908 Worcester by-election, a seat that the Conservatives held. He was Liberal Member of Parliament for Gateshead from 1910 to 1918. Gateshead was a seat that the Liberals had won in 1906 with their candidate being sponsored by the Durham Miners' Association. The miners unions were independent until the Miners' Federation of Great Britain voted to affiliate to the Labour Party. They instructed all miners sponsored MPs to stand for re-election as Labour candidates and this is what happeneded in Gateshead. However, the local Liberal Association wanted a Liberal candidate to defend the seat and selected Elverston. He won the seat and the sitting Labour MP finished bottom of the poll; 

He held the seat at the following General Election shortly after;

He did not stand for parliament again. He was knighted in 1911. 
He sought to defend his seat at the General Election at the end of the war but was up against a Unionist candidate who was supported by the Coalition Government. As a result, he finished bottom of the poll;

He was elected as a member of Cheshire County Council in 1921. He again served on the Executive Committee of the National Liberal Federation from 1921 to 1925. 
Outside politics he was a member of the Council of Manchester Royal College of Music. He was a member of the Advisory Committee of the Royal London Mutual Assurance Society. He was a Director of Mutual Finance Ltd.

Sources
Who Was Who
British parliamentary election results 1885–1918, Craig, F. W. S.

References

External links 
Who Was Who; http://www.ukwhoswho.com

1866 births
1941 deaths
Councillors in Cheshire
Councillors in Manchester
Knights Bachelor
Liberal Party (UK) MPs for English constituencies
UK MPs 1910
UK MPs 1910–1918